George Bennett (16 August 1906 – 15 April 1983) was an Australian cricketer. He played one first-class match for New South Wales in 1933/34.

See also
 List of New South Wales representative cricketers

References

External links
 

1906 births
1983 deaths
Australian cricketers
New South Wales cricketers
Cricketers from Sydney